Selah Saterstrom is an American author, originally from the south. She is the author of five books: Rancher (Burrow Press, 2021), Ideal Suggestions: Essays in Divinatory Poetics(Essay Press, 2017), Slab(Coffee House Press, 2015), The Meat and Spirit Plan(Coffee House Press, 2007), and The Pink Institution (Coffee House Press, 2004).  Her work has twice been nominated for the Believer Book Award. She is a full professor and the director of Creative Writing at the University of Denver.

Bibliography
 The Pink Institution (Coffee House Press, 2004)
 The Meat and Spirit Plan (Coffee House Press, 2007)
 Slab (Coffee House Press, 2015)
 Ideal Suggestions: Essays in Divinatory Poetics (Essay Press, 2017)
Rancher (Burrow Press, 2021)

References

Living people
American women novelists
Goddard College alumni
Year of birth missing (living people)
21st-century American women